Aphoebantus conurus is a species of bee flies in the family Bombyliidae.

References

Further reading

External links 

 
 

Bombyliidae
Insects described in 1887